Jacob Dowse is an Australian professional footballer who plays as a midfielder for Perth Glory.

Youth career 
Jacob played for the Newcastle Jets FC Youth in the National Premier Leagues Northern NSW, before he was eventually released due to numerous knee injuries.

Broadmeadow Magic 
Following his release from the Newcastle Jets, he was contacted by close friend Jeremy Wilson to play for Broadmeadow Magic FC. He impressed enough in the youth ranks to earn his first team debut at the age of 16.

Perth Glory 
He made his A-League Men debut against Central Coast Mariners on 23 October 2022 coming off the bench in a 2–1 win.

Dowse was offered a trial at Perth by his former coach at Broadmeadow Magic, Ruben Zadkovich who is now the head coach of Perth Glory. The trial was successful and he signed a scholarship contract with the club.

References

External links

Living people
Australian soccer players
Association football midfielders
Perth Glory FC players
National Premier Leagues players
A-League Men players
2000 births